The Porsche 356/2, produced in Gmünd, Austria, was the first iteration of the iconic Porsche 356 sports car. Produced between 1948 and 1951, the Porsche 356/2 was the first series production aluminum bodied sports car of Porsche after the creation of the 356-001 one-off prototype in Gmund Austria. It was built in limited numbers, making it a highly sought-after collector's item today.

The Porsche 356/2 was designed by Ferry Porsche and Erwin Komenda, and was based on components from the Volkswagen Beetle. The car was built using lightweight aluminum body panels and a welded steel box chassis with integrated floorplan, which helped to keep its weight low and provide nimble handling. The flat-four engine, which was also based on the Volkswagen Beetle, provided lively performance and was mounted in the rear of the car.

The exterior design of the Porsche 356/2 was simple, yet elegant, and featured a sloping hood, rounded fenders, and a streamlined profile. The car was available in both a coupé and cabriolet body style, and the interior was designed to be functional, with a simple dashboard and instrument panel. The car was also equipped with large windows, providing excellent visibility and a bright, airy cabin.

One of the defining features of the Porsche 356/2 produced in Gmünd was its hand-built construction. Each car was built by a small team of craftsmen, and each car was given its own unique character and attention to detail. This hand-built construction, combined with the lightweight construction and lively performance, made the Porsche 356/2 an instant classic.

The Porsche 356/2 was a popular choice for racing and rally events, and many early Porsche racing drivers cut their teeth in this car. The car's nimble handling and quick acceleration made it well suited to the demands of competition driving, and the car's success on the track helped to establish Porsche's reputation as a manufacturer of high-performance sports cars.

Today, the Porsche 356/2 produced in Gmünd is highly sought after by collectors and enthusiasts. The car's hand-built construction, lightweight design, and lively performance make it a joy to drive, and its timeless design continues to captivate enthusiasts and collectors around the world.

About 32 aluminum bodied Porsche 356 cars are still in existence, including the 356-001 roadster prototype in the Porsche museum.

First 50 Cars 
Only limited information exists about this post ware period of the company based in Gmund. Herbert Kaes, nephew of Ferdinand Porsche, produced an overview of the first 50 cars in 1951 which is still available in the Porsche company archives and has been published in several publications.  Out of the first 52 chassis, 50 cars are known to have been produced in Austria. Some chassis numbers are missing in this list, most likely they were used for testing and possible never received a body or they might have been used for repairing another damaged chassis. Initially the coupe bodies where produced by Porsche employees, but as they could not keep up with chassis production Porsche also started to outsource body production to Tatra, Kastenhofer and Keibl in Vienna. Convertible versions where produced by Beutler, Kastenhofer and Keibl. In 1950 the porsche company was moved to Stuttgart and production of the steel-bodied 356 pre-A started. Production in Gmund was halted and some of the remaining chassis and bodies where assembled by Porsche Salzburg.

The list shows all chassis numbers with the engine and body number. The chassis where produced and placed in storage on the side of the production hall, final assembly started with a completed body and a chassis chosen on top of a stack of finished chassis, so the body number gives a better representation of the chronological order of production. The engine numbers give a good indication of the origin of the engine. Initially Volkswagen sourced engines where used with "356" added in front of the number. At a certain point Porsche used its own engines which is visible through the low engine numbers starting with number 10 in chassis 356/2-008. Body numbers of the coupe's are listed as 557/xx for the Gmund built versions, except for the versions with a Wx suffix, and 806/xx which are generally believed to be Tatra built bodies.

The race cars 

About 63 chassis have been produced in total out of which about 50 cars have been fully assembled and finished in Austria. The remaining unfinished chassis with Tatra bodies where shipped to Stuttgart and used for the factory and customer racing cars based on the type 514 design, also known as the 356SL. Final assembly was performed at either Reutter, Dannenhauer or the Porsche Stuttgart Werk. The 356SL cars show some inconsistencies because bodies and chassis have been combined whole or in part after crashes and exported car chassis have been renumbered to the 300x/A range. This allowed for the re-use of chassis numbers which prevented the need for new registration and customs paperwork. For instance chassis number 356/2-055 has been re-used at least twice. These cars also have been equipped with various engines because the engines where replaced after a race or before they were sold, so the original first engine numbers are not known. The list below has been assembled based on documents from the Porsche archive which contain detailed chassis and body numbers when Porsche ordered final assembly and modifications at Reutter as wel as from various publications on the many cars still in existence. The 11 or 12 Stutgart cars have been produced and modified over a period of 2 years. 4 cars where initially built for the 1951 24h of Le Mans, and 2 cars where prepared for private entry into various races making them the first dedicated customer racing cars from Porsche. After several crashes an extra car was prepared for 1951 Le Mans. Another 4 where built for the 1952 racing season.

356 2
Porsche